William Stanton (1639–1705) was an English mason and sculptor. He is known particularly for monumental masonry. He is often ferred to as Stanton of Holborn.

Life
He was son of Edward Stanton (d.1686), and nephew of the mason Thomas Stanton (d.1674). Thomas Stanton had set up a business adjacent to St Andrew Holborn in the first half of the seventeenth century.

In 1663 William Stanton became free of the Masons' Company, and was Master of the Company in 1688 and 1689. He worked at Gray's Inn around 1672. In 1686 he became master-mason at Belton House, followed by a commission at Denham Place from 1689; and in 1701 was working at Stonyhurst. Over 30 of his church monuments are recorded.

His apprentices included "Thomas Hill the Younger" son of Thomas Hill Master of the Worshipful Company of Masons.

He died in 1705 and is buried in St Andrew's Church, Holborn.

Monuments

Monument to John Byde in Bengeo (1665)
Monument to the Hon. Penelope Egerton in Westminster Abbey (1670)
Monument to John Bromley in Worcester Cathedral (1674)
Monument to Charles Harsnett in Westminster Abbey (1674)
Monument to Sir John Dormer and his wife Susanna in Quainton (1675)
Monument to Dr Walter Balcanqual in Chirk Church (1678)
Monument to Elizabeth Davies in Monken Hadley (1678)
Monument to Sir John Brownlow, 3rd Baronet and his wife in St Peter and St Paul's Church, Belton (1679)
Monument to Sir Edward Sebright in Besford (1679)
Monument to Ann Filding, Lady Morland in Westminster Abbey (1680)
Ornate pillars in the cloister of the Inner Temple, London (1680)
Monument to William Emmott in Colne (1683)
Monument to John Archer in Theydon Garnon Church (1683)
Monument to Sir Richard Harison and his wife in Hurst, Berkshire (1683)
Monument to the Ladies Hatton in Gretton, Northamptonshire (1684)
Monument to Sir Richard Newdigate, 1st Baronet and his wife in Harefield (1685)
Monument to Mrs Elizabeth Beane at Hythe, Kent (c.1685)
Monument to Sir Richard Atkins, 2nd Baronet and Lady Atkins at St Paul's Church, Clapham (c.1689)
Monument to William Mellish at Ragnell, Nottinghamshire (1690)
Monument to Charles Holloway at St Mary's Church in Oxford (1695)
Monument to Lady Bagot at Blithfield (1695)
Monument to Rev Richard Lucy at Christ Church in Brecon (1696)
Memorial to Lord Rivers at Macclesfield (1696)
Monument to Abraham Stanyon at Harefield (1696)
Monument to Sir John Assheton in Downham (1697)
Monument to Ralph Skynner in Hitchin (1697)
Monument to Chancellor William Lucy at Christ Church in Brecon (1697)
Monument to Lady Isham in Lamport Church (1699)
Monument to Thomas Coventry, 1st Earl of Coventry in Elmley Castle (1699)
Monument to Isaac Motham in Hethersett (1699)
Monument to Lady Williamson in Monkwearmouth (1699)
Monument to Lord Lonsdale in Lowther, Westmorland (1700)
Monument to Richard Shireburn, Mitton church (1701) commissioned by Sir Nicholas Shireburn
Tomb of Dean Henry Fairfax in Norwich Cathedral (1702)
Monument to Judith Chester at Barkway (1702)
Monument to Owen Bold at Wrexham (1703)
Ornamentation at Stonyhurst House (1703)
Monument to Lord Thomas Howard (1651-1701) in Ashtead Church (1703)
Monument to Robert Sidney, 4th Earl of Leicester in Penshurst Church (1704)

Family

His wife Dorothy died in 1707 and is buried in St Andrew's Church, Holborn.

Edward Stanton was his son.

Notes

1639 births
1705 deaths
English sculptors
English male sculptors
English stonemasons